Wrestling at the Commonwealth Games is an optional sport for men only that was one of six to be featured on the Programme in Hamilton 1930. Wrestling was present at all editions of the games program until 1994. The sport was first removed from the program in 1998, when Malaysian organizers replaced it with 10-pin bowling, as the sport lacked popular appeal in the country and medal chances were also low, returning in 2002. In the following edition in 2006, it was again removed for the addition of basketball. The second return was in 2010, when in addition to freestyle wrestling, the Indian organizers chose Greco-Roman wrestling as an option, understanding that the chances of the country in other sports were low and since then the sport has not been removed. Being present in the 2014, 2018 and 2022 editions, the sport is not yet confirmed in the 2026 edition.

Editions

All-time medal table
Updated after the 2022 Commonwealth Games

See also

Badminton at the Commonwealth Games
Athletics at the Commonwealth Games
Tennis at the Commonwealth Games
Gymnastics at the Commonwealth Games

References

External links
Commonwealth Games sport index

 
Sports at the Commonwealth Games
Commonwealth Games